(r. 20–24 CE) was a Satavahana king who ruled in present-day Deccan region. The Matsya Purana mentions him as the 17th ruler of the Satavahana dynasty.

The Maharashtri Prakrit poem by Kouhala, Lilavai (c. 800 CE) describes his romance with a princess of Simhaladvipa (identified with present-day Sri Lanka). Vijayananda, the commander-in-chief of Hala's army led a successful campaign in Ceylon. On his way back, he stayed at Sapta Godavari Bhimam. Here, he learned of Lilavai, the beautiful daughter of the king of Ceylon. King  secured Lilavai and married her.

 is famous for compiling an anthology of Maharashtri Prakrit poems known as the Gaha Sattasai (Sanskrit:), although from linguistic evidence it seems that the work now extant must have been re-edited in the succeeding century or two.

Notes

1st-century Indian monarchs
1st-century Indian poets
Satavahana dynasty
Prakrit literature
Indian male poets